My Lips Are Sealed may refer to:

"My Lips Are Sealed", a 1956 song by Jim Reeves
"My Lips Are Sealed" (Scrubs), an episode of the television show Scrubs

See also
 "Our Lips Are Sealed"
 Sealed Lips (disambiguation)